HMCS Newington was a commissioned patrol vessel of the Royal Canadian Navy  that served in the First World War. Prior to the war, the ship served as a fishing trawler and lighthouse tender for the Canadian government. Following the war the vessel was returned to government service. Newington was converted to a tugboat in 1920. Sold to private interests in 1920 the ship sank on 26 August 1959 while laid up in Burrard Inlet, British Columbia.

Description
The ship was powered by a steam triple expansion engine, driving one screw creating  (nominal). The vessel could carry  of coal for fuel.

Service history
The ship was built as an iron-hulled fishing trawler by Cook, Welton & Gemmell at Hull for City Steam Fishing Co Ltd. Newington was launched on 2 March 1899 and completed on 1 April of that year. Newington was purchased by the Canadian government in 1908 and converted to a lighthouse supply ship and buoy tender for use in British Columbia waters.

Following the declaration of war by Canada the First World War in August 1914, Newington was taken over by the Royal Canadian Navy and fitted to lay naval mines. Newington was kept on standby to lay minefields across the entrance to Johnstone Strait until December of that year when the German threat in the Pacific Ocean was nullified. Newington had the minelaying equipment removed and was used as a patrol vessel along the West Coast of Canada for the rest of the war. The ship returned to civilian service in 1920, sold to the Pacific Coyle Navigation Company. The vessel was converted to a tugboat and in 1956, was sold to Straits Towing Ltd. On 26 August 1959 she sank in Burrard Inlet, British Columbia.

Notes

Citations

References

External links
 Converted civilian vessels

Patrol vessels of the Royal Canadian Navy
1899 ships
Auxiliary ships of the Royal Canadian Navy
Canadian Government Ship
Lighthouse tenders of Canada
Ships built in England